Chrysorthenches is a genus of moths of the family Plutellidae.

Species
Species in this genus includes:
Chrysorthenches argentea Dugdale, 1996 – New Zealand 
Chrysorthenches callibrya (Turner, 1923) – Australia
Chrysorthenches drosochalca (Meyrick, 1905) – New Zealand 
Chrysorthenches glypharcha (Meyrick, 1919) – New Zealand  
Chrysorthenches halocarpi Dugdale, 1996 – New Zealand  
Chrysorthenches lagarostrobi Dugdale, 1996 – Tasmania, Australia
Chrysorthenches microstrobi Dugdale, 1996 – Tasmania, Australia  
Chrysorthenches muraseae Sohn & Kobayashi, 2020 – Japan
Chrysorthenches phyllocladi Dugdale, 1996 – New Zealand  
Chrysorthenches polita (Philpott, 1918) – New Zealand 
Chrysorthenches porphyritis (Meyrick, 1885) – New Zealand
Chrysorthenches smaragdina Sohn, 2020 – Thailand
Chrysorthenches virgata (Philpott, 1920) – New Zealand

References

Plutellidae
Moth genera
Taxa named by John Stewart Dugdale